James Dorn Oglesby (August 10, 1905 – September 1, 1955) was an American Major League Baseball first baseman, appearing in three games for the Philadelphia Athletics during the  season. He died of a self-inflicted gunshot wound in 1955.

References

External links

1905 births
1955 suicides
Albany Senators players
Baseball players from Missouri
Buffalo Bisons (minor league) players
Burlington Bees players
Dallas Steers players
Des Moines Demons players
Kansas City Blues (baseball) players
Little Rock Travelers players
Los Angeles Angels (minor league) players
Major League Baseball infielders
Memphis Chickasaws players
Minneapolis Millers (baseball) players
Minor league baseball managers
Nashville Vols players
Okmulgee Drillers players
Paris Bearcats players
Philadelphia Athletics players
Sioux Falls Canaries managers
Suicides by firearm in Oklahoma